Poem for Malcolm  is a jazz album by Archie Shepp. Recorded in Paris in August 1969 only two days after Yasmina, a Black Woman, it again features musicians from the Art Ensemble of Chicago. This time, the tone is resolutely set to avant garde and free jazz, with a political edge in the all but explicit tribute to Malcolm X. The Allmusic review by Scott Yanow states: "This LP from the English Affinity LP is a mixed bag. Best is 'Rain Forrest' on which tenor saxophonist Archie Shepp, in a collaboration with trombonist Grachan Moncur III, pianist Vince Benedetti, bassist Malachi Favors, and drummer Philly Joe Jones, perform some stirring free jazz; the interplay between Shepp and Jones is particularly exciting. On a four-and-a-half minute 'Oleo,' Shepp "battles" some bebop with fellow tenor Hank Mobley, but the other two tracks, a workout for the leader's erratic soprano on 'Mamarose,' and his emotional recitation on 'Poem for Malcolm,' are much less interesting, making this a less than essential release despite 'Rain Forrest'." It was originally issued on CD by Affinity (paired with Yasmina, a Black Woman) mastered from a vinyl source and later reissued by Charly (also paired with Yasmina, a Black Woman) from the original master tapes.

Track listing
 "Mamarose" (Shepp) – 7:12
 "Poem for Malcolm" (Shepp) – 5:55
 "Rain Forrest/Oleo" (Shepp/Sonny Rollins) – 19:16
Recorded: Paris, August 14, 1969.

Personnel

On "Rain Forrest/Oleo"

 Archie Shepp – tenor saxophone, piano
 Hank Mobley – tenor saxophone
 Grachan Moncur III – trombone
 Vince Benedetti – piano
 Malachi Favors – bass
 Philly Joe Jones – drums

On "Mamarose" and "Poem for Malcolm"

 Archie Shepp – soprano saxophone, recitation
 Burton Greene – piano
 Alan Silva – bass
 Philly Joe Jones, Claude Delcloo – drums

References

1969 albums
Archie Shepp albums
BYG Actuel albums
Cultural depictions of Malcolm X
Free jazz albums